Asa Hodges (January 22, 1822 – June 6, 1900) was an American U.S. Representative for Arkansas's 1st congressional district, with service from 1873 to 1875.

Born near Moulton in Lawrence County in northern Alabama, Hodges moved to Marion in Crittenden County in northeastern Arkansas. He attended La Grange Male and Female College in LaGrange, Missouri, now part of Hannibal-LaGrange University in Hannibal, Missouri. He studied law, was admitted to the bar in 1848, and practiced until 1860. Prior to the American Civil War, Hodges owned many slaves near Memphis, Tennessee.

He served as delegate to the Arkansas constitutional convention in 1867. He was a member of the Arkansas House of Representatives for a partial term in 1868 and the Arkansas Senate from 1870 to 1873.

Hodges was elected as a Republican to the 43rd United States Congress (March 4, 1873 – March 3, 1875) to Arkansas' First District. He did not seek reelection in 1874 to the Forty-fourth Congress and was succeeded by the Democrat Lucien C. Gause. Thereafter, he engaged in farming.

Family
On April 17, 1858, he married Caroline Sarah Turpin Chick, the widow of his relative, John W. Hodges. He died near Marion and is interred next to his wife at Elmwood Cemetery in Memphis in Shelby County.

References

1822 births
1900 deaths
People from Lawrence County, Alabama
Republican Party members of the United States House of Representatives from Arkansas
Republican Party members of the Arkansas House of Representatives
Republican Party Arkansas state senators
American planters
Arkansas lawyers
American slave owners
People from Marion, Arkansas
19th-century American politicians
19th-century American lawyers
Burials in Tennessee